Sergio Navarretta is a Canadian film director, who draws inspiration from Italian cinema. Navarretta is best known for The Cuban, and his first feature film Looking for Angelina, based on the true-life story of Angelina Napolitano. The International Women of the World in Bologna, Italy presented Navarretta with a special award on September 18, 2010, for his work on Looking For Angelina. Navarretta is a co-founder of S.N.A.P. Films Inc., along with his partner Alessandra Piccione.

Navarretta has directed several other projects including the short film, Serena DeBergerac, and the award-winning Over a Small Cup of Coffee, which premiered at the Toronto Italian Film Awards in June 2001. He directed the documentary Going to the Movies, which premiered in September 2002 at the Academy of Canadian Cinema and Television screening series, and the dramatic film, Il Bagno (The Bath), which premiered in June 2002 at the Toronto Italian Film Festival.  In 2003 he directed another short film, Commedia, an operatic piece inspired by Commedia dell’arte characters and aerial acrobatics, which appeared on Bravo! later that year. In 2012 he directed The Fortune Cookie  and it won a Best in Shorts Award  and in 2014 he directed En Plein Air  which showcased at Nuit Blanche in Sault Ste. Marie, Ontario.

In 2015 Navarretta directed, The Colossal Failure of the Modern Relationship, a comedy/drama shot entirely in Niagara's wine country. Starring Krista Bridges (Heroes Reborn), Enrico Colantoni (Flashpoint, Just Shoot Me) and David Cubitt (Traders, Medium). The film had its world premiere at the Niagara Integrated Film Festival; its western Canada premiere at the Whistler Film Festival  and its U.S. premiere at Sonoma International Film Festival. The film won the Castlepoint Numa Award at the ICFF festival in Toronto. Navarretta is a founding member of the Town of Innisfil's Arts Culture and Heritage Council and served as Vice Chair of that council for a year.

In 2015, he was an executive producer on Arctic Dogs the animated feature film starring Jeremy Renner, Alec Baldwin, James Franco, Heidi Klum, John Cleese, Anjelica Huston, Omar Sy, Michael Madsen, and Laurie Holden.

In 2018, he directed The Cuban, starring Oscar winner Louis Gossett Jr. and Shohreh Aghdashloo. The film, shooting in Brantford and Brant County in southern Ontario through mid-May, also stars Degrassi: Next Class actress Ana Golja, Giacomo Gianniotti and Lauren Holly.

Navarretta has a background in music from The Royal Conservatory of Music and is a member of the DGC (Directors Guild of Canada).  He served as a mentor in this years’ Being Black in Toronto initiative and is teaching a Masterclass for Reel Works in New York City, whose mission is to empower underserved youth. Navarretta has been invited to contribute to panels and public forums for organizations such as: The Academy of Film and Television; WIFT; TIFF and FOLCS (New York).  His thought leadership mission includes topics such as:  filmmaking; surviving as an artist during COVID-19, mental wellness and the importance of diversity in film and television.

Selected filmography 
 Lamborghini - The Legend
 The Cuban 
 Trading Paint
 The Fortune Cookie (Short) 
 Arctic Justice
 Bent
 Andron
 The Colossal Failure of the Modern Relationship
 En Plein Air II (Short) 
 Serena DeBergerac (Short) 
 Looking for Angelina
 Commedia (Short)

Awards and nominations 

 Best Shorts Competition 2012 – Winner of Award of Merit for "The Fortune Cookie" 
 Italian Contemporary Film Festival 2015 – Winner of Castlepoint Numa Award for the production of "The Colossal Failure of the Modern Relationship"

References

External links 
 
 Personal website

Canadian film directors
Living people
Year of birth missing (living people)
Italian emigrants to Canada